Clack may refer to:

People

Last name 
 Arthur Baker-Clack (1877–1955), born Arthur Baker Clack Australian expatriate impressionist artist 
 Boyd Clack (born 1951), Welsh writer, actor and musician
 Brenda Clack (born July 22, 1945), politician
 Charles Clack (1857–1932), American politician
 Jennifer A. Clack (1947–2020), paleonthologist and evolution specialist
 Jim Clack (1947–2006), player of American football
 Kris Clack (born 1977), basketball player
 Peter Clack, rock and roll drummer
 Zoanne Clack (born 1968), television producer, writer, story editor and actress

First name 
 Clack Stone (fl. 1827–1839), militia captain during the 1832 Black Hawk War

Nickname 
 Clack, of Click and Clack the hosts of Car Talk

Other uses 
 Drusilla Clack (Miss Clack), a character in the 1868 novel The Moonstone
 Clack the Miller, a character in the 1662 play Grim the Collier of Croydon

See also 
 Clack Island (Queensland)
 Clackamas (disambiguation) 
 Clackers (disambiguation)
 Clack Mill Brook, now known as Siston Brook, in South Gloucestershire, England